Hetty Balkenende (also spelled Hettie, born 1939) is a former freestyle swimmer and synchronized swimmer from the Netherlands who won a silver medal in the 4×100 m freestyle relay at the 1954 European Aquatics Championships. In 1955, she helped the Dutch team to set the world record in the same event; she also won two national titles (100 m and 400 m freestyle), broke two national records in the 400 m freestyle, and the world record on the 880 yards – all in one year. 
She was selected for the Dutch Olympic team, but the Netherlands boycotted the 1956 Summer Olympics in protest over the Soviet handling of the Hungarian uprising, so that Balkenende missed the opportunity to acquire an Olympic medal.

After retiring from competitive swimming she switched to synchronized swimming and became the unofficial European champion at the 1963 European Championships for all three routines (solo, pair, and technical). She married Jens Svensson on 15 April 1967. As a Norwegian, Hetty Svensson-Balkenende won the national and Scandinavian/Nordic championships synchronized swimming in 1970.

References

1939 births
Living people
Dutch female freestyle swimmers
Dutch synchronized swimmers
European Aquatics Championships medalists in swimming
World record setters in swimming
Swimmers from Amsterdam
20th-century Dutch women
20th-century Dutch people